South Boulder Creek is a tributary of Boulder Creek in central Colorado in the United States.  Its source is near Rogers Pass on the Continental Divide. The stream flows to a confluence with Boulder Creek in northeast Boulder. Gross Dam is located on South Boulder Creek, approximately  miles west of Eldorado Springs, Colorado.

See also

 List of rivers of Colorado

References

External links

Rivers of Colorado
Rivers of Boulder County, Colorado
Rivers of Gilpin County, Colorado